Gert Peens (born 22 March 1974 in Germiston, Gauteng, South Africa) is a former Italian rugby union footballer. His usual position is on the wing.

Playing career

Rugby Union
He played for Italian club L'Aquila Rugby. Peens has also been capped for the national team, and was a part of their squad at the 2003 Rugby World Cup in Australia. He has been a goal kicker for Italy.

Peens made his international debut for Italy in 2002 against Wales. He became a regular in the Italian Test side, and in 2003 was included in their World Cup squad for Australia. He played in Italy's opening match against the All Blacks in Melbourne, kicking a conversion in the game. His current club is L'Aquila, but he has played for a number of other teams in the Italian Super 10.

Rugby League
He also plays rugby league with the North West Roosters and is an Italian international in rugby league.

References

External links
 Gert Peens on rwc2003.irb.com

1974 births
Living people
Alumni of Monument High School
Italian rugby league players
Italian rugby union players
Italian sportspeople of African descent
Italy international rugby union players
Italy national rugby league team players
North West Roosters players
Rugby league players from Gauteng
Rugby Roma Olimpic players
Rugby union fullbacks
Rugby union players from Germiston
South African emigrants to Italy
South African rugby league players
South African rugby union players
Sportspeople from Germiston